The Annie Award for Editorial in an Animated Television/Broadcast Production is an Annie Award given annually to the best editing in a television or broadcast productions. It was first presented at the 39th Annie Awards with the name Best Editing in a Television Production, the name was changed to its current name the following year.

Winners and nominees

2010s

2020s

See also
 American Cinema Editors Award for Best Edited Animation (Non-Theatrical)

References

External links 
 Annie Awards: Legacy

Annie Awards